Eucalyptus praetermissa is a species of mallet that is endemic to a small area on the south coast of Western Australia. It has smooth bark, lance-shaped adult leaves, flower buds in groups of up to fifteen, creamy white to pale yellow flowers and cylindrical to barrel-shaped fruit.

Description
Eucalyptus praetermissa is a mallet that typically grows to a height of  but does not form a lignotuber. Flowering occurs from November to January and the flowers are creamy white to pale yellow.

Taxonomy and naming
Eucalyptus praetermissa was first formally described in 1991 by Ian Brooker and Stephen Hopper from a specimen collected by Brooker on the north side of Beaufort Inlet in 1984. The specific epithet (praetermissa) is a Latin word meaning "overlooked", "omitted" or "neglected", referring to the fact that this species was known but ignored.

Distribution and habitat
This eucalypt is only known from the type location where it grows in low woodland on sand over laterite.

Conservation status
This mallet is classified as "Priority Four" by the Government of Western Australia Department of Parks and Wildlife, meaning that is rare or near threatened.

See also
List of Eucalyptus species

References

Eucalypts of Western Australia
Trees of Australia
praetermissa
Myrtales of Australia
Plants described in 1991
Taxa named by Ian Brooker
Taxa named by Stephen Hopper